Balaban (also Ballaban, Ballabon) is a surname, from a Turkic word meaning "robust", "burly", or a Ukrainian word meaning "hawk". Notable people with the surname include:

 Alexandru Balaban (1931–), Romanian chemist
 Alper Balaban (1987–2010), Turkish footballer
 A. J. Balaban (1889–1962), co-founder of Balaban and Katz
 Barney Balaban (1887–1971), co-founder of Balaban and Katz
 Bob Balaban (1945–), American actor and director (related to the founders of Balaban and Katz)
 Boško Balaban (1978–), Croatian footballer
 Elmer Balaban (1909–2001), American theater owner and early cable television executive
 İbrahim Balaban (1921–2019), Turkish painter
 Jan Balabán (1961–2010), Czech writer
 John Balaban (poet) (1943–), American poet and translator
 Judy Balaban (born 1932), American actress and author 
 Liane Balaban (1980–), Canadian actress
 Meir Balaban  (1874–1941), Polish Jewish historian
 Miriam Balaban, scientist
 Nina Balaban (1995–), Macedonian sports shooter
 Ștefan Balaban (1890–1962), Romanian brigadier generał

Fictional
 Megadirettore Galattico (Galactic Megadirector) Duca Conte (Duke Count) Francesco Maria Balabam, one of the main characters in the novels and films about Ugo Fantozzi.

See also
 Balabanov